Alice Elizabeth Nunn (October 10, 1927 – July 1, 1988) was an American film and theatre actress. She was born in Jacksonville, Florida, and died at her apartment in West Hollywood, California. Although she played many roles across her 31-year career, appearing in more than 50 films and TV series, she is primarily remembered for her role as Large Marge, the ghost of a storied truck driver, in Tim Burton's 1985 film Pee-wee's Big Adventure, which is number 5 on the IFC list of the 25 scariest moments in non-horror film history, and earned her a cult following.

Life and career
Nunn was born in Jacksonville in 1927 to N.G. Nunn and Alice Bush. She showed an early interest in the performing arts and took part in a school production of My Sister Eileen. She studied acting at Wesleyan University and took classes with the American Theater Wing. After some radio work, she got an acting part in New Faces of 1956 and played in the theatre alongside Shelley Berman and Nancy Walker.

She became a character actress, and appeared on television's Petticoat Junction in the episodes "Shoplifter at the Shady Rest" (1967, as Mrs. Benson); "Mae's Helping Hand" (1968); and the 1969 episodes "The Other Woman" (as Mrs. Birdwell) and "Kathy Joe's First Birthday Party" (as "Lady with wallet"). She also appeared on Ironside and The Wild Wild West.

She appeared in numerous sitcoms, such as Camp Runamuck, where she played Mahala May Gruenecker, the head counselor of Camp Divine, and the chief opponent of Commander Wivenhoe (played by series star Arch Johnson). In her sitcom appearances in the 1960s, she often played strong-willed, edgy women, but in a humorous vein.

Nunn's first film appearance was in Johnny Got His Gun (1971) where she played a nurse. She was a regular cast member of the Tony Orlando and Dawn variety show; and has small parts in films such as the "Fat Lady" in Mame (1974), and in Airport 1975. She appeared as Mrs. Callahan in Brian De Palma's The Fury (1978). She played Duffy the Cook in Alan Beattie's slasher/mystery Delusion (1980) (also known as The House Where Death Lives) with Patricia Pearcy and Joseph Cotten, and the maid Helga in Mommie Dearest (1981).

She is most widely known for her role as Large Marge, a ghostly truck driver who frightens Pee-wee Herman in the film Pee-wee's Big Adventure (1985), providing what has been called one of the scariest moments in non-horror film history. In Trick or Treat (1986), she played Mrs. Sylvia Cavell, and appeared in Who's That Girl (1987) with Madonna. Her last role was that of Nurse Palmer in Three O'Clock High (1987).

Nunn died in 1988 at her apartment in West Hollywood, California of a heart attack at age 60.

Filmography

References

External links

 
 
 
Alice Nunn at Find A Grave

1927 births
1988 deaths
American film actresses
American stage actresses
American television actresses
Actresses from Jacksonville, Florida
Actresses from Los Angeles
20th-century American actresses